Dyne Fenton Smith (21 July 1890 – 28 August 1969) was an English rugby union international who played on two occasions for his country and was part of the first official British Isles team that toured South Africa in 1910.

Early life
Dyne Fenton Smith was born in 1890 in Hove, Sussex, the eldest son of Charles Edward Smith, a stock jobber who although born in France was of British parentage, and his wife Caroline Constance Fenton from Goodmanham, Yorkshire. Dyne had a number of siblings, including younger brother Leonard and younger sister Enid.

Rugby career
Smith played his club rugby for Richmond F.C. He made his Test debut for England vs Wales at Twickenham on 15 Jan 1910, in which game England were victorious. He played once again in the draw against Ireland on 12 February. This was his last game for England, but he was selected for the first official British Isles team that toured South Africa in 1910 (in that it was sanctioned and selected by the four Home Nations official governing bodies). He played on all three tests.

International matches played
for England
 , 15 Jan 1910, at Twickenham. England won 11 - 6
 , 12 Feb 1910, at Twickenham. draw 0 - 0
for British Isles
 , 6 Aug 1910, at Johannesburg.  South Africa won 14 - 10
 , 27 Aug 1910, at Port Elizabeth.  Great Britain won 8 - 3
 , 3 Sep 1910, at Cape Town.  South Africa won 21 - 5

First World War
Fenton Smith served in First World War as a lieutenant in the Royal Fusiliers. He served in France from 1915.

Personal life
Smith married in 1911 and for a time lived in Walton-on-Thames where he had a firm, Fenton Smith Bros.

References

1890 births
1969 deaths
British & Irish Lions rugby union players from England
British Army personnel of World War I
England international rugby union players
English rugby union players
Richmond F.C. players
Royal Fusiliers officers
Rugby union locks
Rugby union players from Brighton